Karambayam is a village in Pattukkottai in the Indian state of Tamil Nadu. The village has Muthu Mariyamman Temple, an Amman temple.

Statistics

External links
Thanjavur
ANNUAL EMPLOYMENT REPORT,THANJAVUR

Villages in Thanjavur district